The Dixon House Band was a prog-rock/pop group based in Seattle, Washington in the late 1970s.  It issued one album on New York City-based Infinity Records in 1979 entitled Fighting Alone and had a minor chart hit with the song "Sooner Or Later".

The band got its name from the founder and keyboard player/lead vocalist, Dixon House. The band's sound was a cross between the vocal sound and melodic hooks of Styx combined with some of the musical prowess and lyricism of Kansas, but with heavier guitars using a thinly compressed sound. It also had a female guitarist like Seattle counterpart Heart. Like many rock groups of its day at the dawn of the 1980s, it suffered from poor promotion and record company support.

Members of the band were: 
Dixon House on keyboards and vocals 
Chrissy Shefts on guitars
Chuck Gardner on guitars 
James Kenfield on bass
Fred Zeufeldt on drums

Discography

The Dixon House Band released one album that consisted of eleven tracks. All the lyrics and music were written by Edward Dixon House.  Dixon House was a well-known and popular band leader and singer in Victoria who moved to Vancouver in 1974 to pursue a recording career. The band worked with Vancouver's Mushroom Records and producer Mike Flicker, who supported and promoted the band. He had also produced albums for the band Heart while they were signed to the Mushroom label. Once they found success, Heart returned to their hometown of Seattle but continued to work with Flicker. The Dixon House Band travelled to Seattle to record "Fighting Alone" at Sea-West Studios, which was produced by Flicker for Mike Flicker Productions.

Fighting Alone
(Infinity 1979) Produced by Mike Flicker
 Sooner or later
 Crusader
 Turn around
 Angela
 Who's gonna love you tonight? 
 Fighting
 Feelin' no pain
 Runnin' scared
 Saracen ride
 The promise
 Fighting alone

E. Dixon House
(Edward) Dixon House (1950-) is currently a classical playwright and works in conjunction with Stuart Joseph Johnston (1951-).

His solo work includes:

Masked Madness
(1981)
 Just one kiss (House & Leese) 
 Wait for the night
 Green light
 Our love
 Too late, Belinda
 Masked madness
 If you wanna go the distance (beat them to the punch)
 Layanna (House & Leese)
 Automatic Pilot
 All too clear

Other work
Jealousy (1982), words and music by R Meisner, D House and H Leese
It ain't no mystery (1985), by Stuart Joseph Johnston & Edward Dixon House
The face of the dove (1988), screenplay by Stuart Joseph Johnston & Edward Dixon House

Reference and notes

External links
http://www.myspace.com/dixonhouseband

American progressive rock groups
Musical groups from Washington (state)
American pop music groups